Total Car Parks, established in 2008, is a British company with its head office in Colchester, UK.  An approved member of the British Parking Association, the company operates car parks in various regions, in particular Manchester, using an online pre-payment model. Its aim, according to its head office, is to provide parking services to the average motorist at affordable prices.

History

Technology and advancements 

The firm launched a mobile-friendly webpage to facilitate pre-payment of tickets. This use of technology has led to an increase of accountability. It also sends the motorist a reminder 10 minutes before their ticket is due to expire, letting them know that they are in need of a new ticket. Other car parks have used this model of framework to their advantage.

Some of the car parks also have solar powered ticket machines and licence plate recognition technology.

References 

Companies based in Colchester
Parking companies